Geritt Willem Ovink, (1912 - 1984) was a Dutch professor of History and Aesthetics of Printing Art, and legibility researcher.   He was a laudator of the second Gutenberg Prize winner Henri Friedlaender.

Ovinik focused on the readability of modern pamphlets, and ventured with the re-casting of old writings of the 19th century, a "typographic revolution".

Prizes and awards 
In 1983, the Geritt Willem Ovink received the Gutenberg Prize of the International Gutenberg Society and the City of Mainz for the re-casting of ancient writings (lost advertisements of the 19th century). The typeface Ovink is named after him.

External links 

 Legibility, atmosphere-value and forms of printing types (Doctoral dissertion by Ovink)
 1983 Gerrit Willem Ovink

References 

Typographers and type designers
1912 births
1984 deaths
German graphic designers